The Meyer Theatre is a historic theater located in Green Bay, Wisconsin. Originally known as the Fox Theatre, the building was constructed in 1929 in the Art Deco and Spanish Colonial Revival architecture styles. Its opening on February 14, 1930, was celebrated with a festival that drew thousands of guests, including several Fox Films officials.

History
After Fox Theatres Inc. declared bankruptcy in 1933, the theater was operated as the Bay Theatre until 1998. It was added to the National Register of Historic Places in 2000. The building was restored in 2002 and renamed the Robert T. Meyer Theatre, in honor of a former Green Bay businessman.  It was re-opened in 2003. Upon re-opening, it was managed by the Weidner Center for the Performing Arts. Today the Meyer Theatre Corporation is contracted with PMI Entertainment Group to do the booking and handle management of the facility.

References

External links

 

Cinemas and movie theaters in Wisconsin
Buildings and structures in Green Bay, Wisconsin
Art Deco architecture in Wisconsin
Spanish Colonial Revival architecture in the United States
Theatres completed in 1929
Theatres on the National Register of Historic Places in Wisconsin
National Register of Historic Places in Brown County, Wisconsin
Public venues with a theatre organ